John Frederick Lillicrap (1866–1937) was the 29th Mayor of Invercargill from 1921 to 1923. He had been a Borough councillor from 1901 to 1906 and from 1909 to 1921.

He was born in Wellington in 1866, and moved to Invercargill as a child. His father Captain Vernon Lillicrap was in charge of the Immigration Barracks.

He was a lawyer, and also practised from 1929 to 1936 in Palmerston North. He married Catherine Anne Wilson in 1899; they had one son and one daughter.

References
Obituary "Long civic record" in Southland Times, 17 November 1937 
Obituary in Evening Post, 18 November 1937 Obituary 
Cyclopaedia of New Zealand (1905); reference to Councillors Longuet and Lillicrap 

1866 births
1937 deaths
Burials at Eastern Cemetery, Invercargill
Deputy mayors of Invercargill
Mayors of Invercargill
20th-century New Zealand lawyers
Unsuccessful candidates in the 1914 New Zealand general election
Reform Party (New Zealand) politicians
19th-century New Zealand lawyers